De Bary may refer to:

 DeBary, Florida, city in the United States 
 De Barry family, noble family of Cambro-Norman origins
 Heinrich Anton de Bary (1831–1888), German scientist
 Jakob Erckrath de Bary (1864–1938), German fencer
 William Theodore de Bary (1919–2017), American sinologist and East Asian studies expert